The Kartitsch Saddle (elevation 1,525 m) is a high mountain pass in Austria between the Dolomites and the Carnic Alps in the Bundesland of Tyrol.

See also
 List of highest paved roads in Europe
 List of mountain passes

External links
 Profile on climbbybike.com

Mountain passes of Tyrol (state)
Mountain passes of the Alps